Nørre Nebel is a town in southwest Jutland with a population of 1,316 (1 January 2022). The town is influenced by tourism, and most of the inhabitants are working with handicrafts, trade or services. Nørre Nebel is located about 23 kilometers from Varde and Tarm.

References

Sources 
 "BEF44: Population 1st January, by urban areas" database from Statistics Denmark
 http://www.maplandia.com/denmark/ribe/blabjerg/norre-nebel/

Cities and towns in the Region of Southern Denmark
Varde Municipality